Grey Dawn was the second full release of death/doom metal band October Tide. This is the only October Tide release with Mårten Hansen in the band, and the last with Jonas Renkse. The album was reissued on 23 November 1999.

Track listing
All music composed by October Tide. All lyrics written by Mårten Hansen.

Personnel
Mårten Hansen – vocals
Fred Norrman – guitar, bass guitar
Jonas Renkse – drums, guitar

References

1999 albums
October Tide albums